Robin Ziegele (born 13 March 1997) is a German professional footballer who plays as a centre-back for 3. Liga club FSV Zwickau.

Career
After playing youth football with JSG Mörse/Ehmen and VfL Wolfsburg, Ziegele started his senior career with VfL Wolfsburg II during the 2016–17 seasons and made 53 appearances, scoring three goals, across three seasons at the club.

In summer 2019, Ziegele signed for Eintracht Braunschweig on a two-year contract. Ziegele made his professional debut for Eintracht Braunschweig in the 3. Liga on 30 July 2019, starting in the away match against Carl Zeiss Jena which finished as a 2–0 win. He made 20 appearances across the 2019–20 season, scoring once, as Braunschweig were promoted to the 2. Bundesliga. He made 15 appearances for the club during the 2020–21 season.

He signed for Regionalliga West club Preußen Münster in September 2021. He made 25 Regionalliga West appearances during the 2021–22 season.

Ziegele signed for FSV Zwickau on 1 July 2022 on a two-year contract for an undisclosed fee.

References

External links
 
 
 

1997 births
Living people
People from Wolfsburg
Footballers from Lower Saxony
German footballers
Germany youth international footballers
Association football central defenders
VfL Wolfsburg II players
VfL Wolfsburg players
Eintracht Braunschweig players
SC Preußen Münster players
FSV Zwickau players
2. Bundesliga players
3. Liga players
Regionalliga players